Thomas Meredith Evans (November 25, 1848 – September 25, 1919) was a member of the Wisconsin State Assembly.

Biography
Evans was born on November 25, 1848 in Iowa County, Wisconsin. He attended the University of Wisconsin-Madison.

On July 1, 1875, Evans married Margaret J. Davis. They had eleven children and resided in Dodgeville, Wisconsin. Evans died on September 25, 1919 from injuries sustained during an accident while operating a grader.

Career
Evans was elected to the Assembly in 1910. He made his living farming and roadworking.

References

People from Dodgeville, Wisconsin
Members of the Wisconsin State Assembly
University of Wisconsin–Madison alumni
1848 births
1919 deaths
Road incident deaths in Wisconsin
19th-century American politicians